Warnervale Airport , also known as Warnervale Aerodrome, is located in Warnervale, a town in New South Wales, Australia. It is operated by Central Coast Council in Wyong, New South Wales. There have also been many plans over the years to expand Warnervale Airport, one was finally approved by the Central Coast Council in early 2022.

Access is via Jack Grant Avenue (off Sparks Road).

Australian Air League
Warnervale Aerodrome is the current base of the Australian Air League Toukley Squadron. Parade nights are held weekly.

See also
List of airports in New South Wales

References

External links
Aircraft photos from Warnervale (YWVA) at Airliners.net

Airports in New South Wales